General elections were held in Puerto Rico on 5 November 1996. Pedro Rosselló of the New Progressive Party (PNP) was re-elected Governor, whilst the PNP also won a majority of seats in the House of Representatives and the Senate. Voter turnout was between 80% and 82%.

Results

Governor

Resident Commissioner

House of Representatives

Senate

References

General elections in Puerto Rico
Puerto Rico
General
Puerto Rico